Eva Diaz is an American politician. Diaz was elected in 2022 to serve in the Arizona State Senate representing District 22 as a member of the Democratic Party, after mounting a write-in campaign as a result of the only candidate on the ballot, Diego Espinoza, withdrawing from the race.

Diaz has also served as Chair of the Tolleson Planning Commission since 2013.

References

Year of birth missing (living people)
Living people
Democratic Party Arizona state senators
21st-century American politicians